Millie Inbetween is a British children's sitcom series broadcast on CBBC and starring Millie Innes. The first episode premiered on 1 October 2014, with the final episode airing on 12 December 2018. It focuses on 12-year-old Millie and her 15-year-old sister whose parents have recently split up. In August 2019, Richard Wisker confirmed that he, Tallulah Greive and Theo Stevenson would reprise their roles from Millie Inbetween in an iPlayer sitcom Flatmates, aimed at an older audience.

Production
In March 2014, BBC commissioned a new 13-part series called The Millie Show. The show name was then changed to Millie Inbetween. It was filmed in Dumbarton, Scotland at the River City Studios, in Northern Ireland in the BBC Blackstaff Studio Complex, and at local locations that resemble Glasgow.

Plot

Series 1
Millie McDonald (Millie Innes) is a 12-year-old girl who lives with her 15-year-old sister Lauren McDonald (Tallulah Greive). Their parents have split up, so the two sisters are constantly swapping living with 'Mum' Sharon, (Hannah Jane Fox) and 'Dad' Tony (James Bachman). Millie loves the upsides of her new family set-up; two Christmas celebrations, two birthdays, and two bedrooms. However, the downsides are more tricky to come to terms with, as her parents start new relationships. The parents' new partners have children, too - and they all want to move in. Sharon has a new partner called Mike (Jeremy Edwards), who has a son called Craig (Theo Stevenson), who is a nightmare. Tony meets a new partner called Amber (Jaye Jacobs), who has 2 children called Fran (Mya-Lecia Naylor) and Jake (Marley Lockhart).

Series 2
Great Aunt Gloria visits, still convinced Sharon and Tony (now played by Richard Lumsden) are still married, Millie celebrates her 13th birthday, Lauren trains for a hike with the school, Millie and Fran go head to head in a spelling-bee, Craig goes to stay with his mum at Christmas when he feels left out at home, Jake and Fran's dad turns up at the flat, Mum loses her job at Sunnyshopper, Mum decides to get tips off of Amber to try and be cool, Millie's English teacher arrives at the house to talk about Millie's poem, Lauren gets all loved up with Craig's new mate, Justin, Tony and Amber split but soon get back together, Jake bonds with Craig after Mike forces Craig to look after him, Mike proposes to Sharon and the whole family go on a camping trip together.

Series 3
Tony and Amber are moving to a bigger flat while Craig has a new mate, Millie tries to be bad in order to go to a party, Amber announces she is pregnant, Millie's grandparents unexpectedly turn up on Christmas Day, Mike loses his job at the gym and is too scared to tell Sharon, Millie needs to start thinking about her subject choices at school, Fran gets a temporary tattoo much to the horror of Amber, it is Father's Day and Tony thinks Millie and Lauren have forgotten about him, the house goes electricity free for a week, Millie, Lauren and Craig want to be home alone so they send Mum and Mike to Dad and Amber's flat, Millie fakes a boyfriend to get the attention of Lauren, Mum and Mike eventually get married and Amber gives birth to a baby boy named Hector.

Series 4
Craig moves out to go to college and Lauren meets a boy named Declan (Richard Wisker), who later becomes her boyfriend. Dad and Amber move to Spain, so Fran and Jake are looked after by their grandma, Flora (Llewella Gideon). Millie tries to befriend a girl, Jessie (Rhianna Merralls) in her maths class who is a 'wild' girl. Meanwhile, Mike’s nephew, Leo (Oscar Morgan), moves into the house. Lauren deletes her social media after a message mix-up and Mum and Mike spark concern when they start to argue. Millie ends a feud between Fran and Jake. Jessie is having trouble at home so Millie tries to help her and Millie starts blogging to give advice to parents. At the end of that series, Lauren leaves to start college and Millie has to decide between her Mum or Dad's holiday. She picks neither of them and decides to volunteer and help in Kenya. Also, as well as Lauren leaving, so does Leo.

Due to Jaye Jacobs returning to Holby City, she became a recurring cast member. Innes served as an associate producer.

Series 5 Specials
Declan and Dad each drop a bombshell and everyone's future is turned upside down. Millie and Craig travel to Spain in a mission. Craig and Millie race against time to try and save her dad's job.

Cast

Episodes

References

External links
 

2014 British television series debuts
2018 British television series endings
2010s British children's television series
BBC high definition shows
BBC television sitcoms
BBC children's television shows
English-language television shows
Television series about children
Television series about sisters
Television series about teenagers
Television series by Banijay
Television shows set in Scotland